StompTown Revival is the first extended play from StompTown Revival. Save the City Records released the EP on October 2, 2012.

Critical reception

Argyrakis writes, "some serious 'spiritual stomp.'" Cummings calls "a breath of fresh air". Roberts comments "finally brought something fresh to the table." Weaver states "[they] have teamed together to forge a sound that sounds classically American, but yet new and refreshing". Caldwell says "this EP feels like a palate cleanser from over-produced and same-sounding worship music." Sheads responds "every track on StompTown Revival's EP oozes with authenticity and soul." Dalton affirms "That fondness gives them a unique sound among Christian artists." Davies replies "Brilliant stuff."

Track listing

Chart performance

References

2012 EPs